Alison Jolly (May 9, 1937 – February 6, 2014) was a primatologist, known for her studies of lemur biology. She wrote several books for both popular and scientific audiences and conducted extensive fieldwork on Lemurs in Madagascar, primarily at the Berenty Reserve, a small private reserve of gallery forest set in the semi-arid spiny desert area in the far south of Madagascar.

Biography
Born Alison Bishop in Ithaca, New York, she held a BA from Cornell University, and a PhD from Yale University; she had been a researcher at the New York Zoological Society, Cambridge University, University of Sussex, Rockefeller University, and Princeton University. In 1998 she was made Officer of the National Order of Madagascar (Officier de l'Ordre National, Madagascar). At the time of her death she was a visiting scientist at the University of Sussex.

Under her maiden name, she first published "Control of the Hand in Lower Primates" in 1962. Jolly began studying lemur behavior at Berenty in 1963 and was first to propose female dominance in a primate society. She encouraged field studies that contributed to knowledge about Malagasy wildlife and advised many researchers; she briefed Jane Wilson-Howarth and colleagues before their first expedition to Madagascar in 1981. Since 1990 Jolly had returned for every birthing season to carry out research assisted by student volunteers.  She focused on ring-tailed lemur demography, ranging, and especially inter-troop and territorial behavior, in the context of the fivefold difference in population density from front to back of the reserve.
 
Her scientific books include Lemur Behavior: A Madagascar Field Study, The Evolution of Primate Behavior and Lucy's Legacy: Sex and Intelligence in Human Evolution. Her non-technical works include Madagascar: A World Out of Time and Lords & Lemurs: Mad Scientists, Kings With Spears, and the Survival of Diversity in Madagascar. She also wrote numerous articles for consumer magazines and scientific journals.

Jolly was the author of two series of children's books—The Ako Books and The Fiddle Stories.

Eponym 

In June 2006, a new species of mouse lemur, Microcebus jollyae, was named in Jolly's honor.

Personal life 

The daughter of the artist Alison Mason Kingsbury and the scholar and poet Morris Bishop, in 1963 Alison Jolly married Richard Jolly, the development economist. She died at home in Lewes, East Sussex, in February 2014 at the age of 76.  She is survived by her husband and their four children.

Publications
Lemur Behavior: A Madagascar Field Study, University of Chicago Press, 1966
The Evolution of Primate Behavior, 1972 
Play: Its Role in Development and Evolution, 1976
A World Like Our Own; Man and Nature in Madagascar, Yale University Press, 1980
Madagascar: A World Out of Time, 1984 with Frans Lanting & Gerald Durrell
Madagascar, Key Environments Series, 1984
Lucy's Legacy: Sex and Intelligence in Human Evolution, 1999
Lords and Lemurs: Mad Scientists, Kings with Spears, and the Survival of Diversity in Madagascar, 2004
Thank You, Madagascar: The Conservation Diaries of Alison Jolly, 2015

Children's books
Ny aiay Ako (Ako the Aye-Aye), 2005
Bitika the Mouselemur, (2012) 
Tik-Tik the Ringtailed Lemur, (2012)
Bounce the White Sifaka, (2012) 
Furry and Fuzzy the Red Ruffed Lemur Twin, (2012)
No-Song the Indri, (2012)
Fiddle and the See-Throughs, (2013)
Fiddle and the Flint-Boy, (2013)
Fiddle and the Headless Horseman, (2013)
Fiddle and the Falling Tower, (2013)
Fiddle and the Smugglers, (2013)
Fiddle and the Fires, (2013)

References

Literature cited

External links

American mammalogists
Women primatologists
Primatologists

Human evolution theorists
American children's writers
Academics of the University of Sussex
American expatriate academics
American expatriates in the United Kingdom
Cornell University alumni
1937 births
2014 deaths
20th-century American women scientists
20th-century American scientists
American women academics
21st-century American women
Recipients of orders, decorations, and medals of Madagascar